War in 140 Characters: How Social Media Is Reshaping Conflict in the Twenty-First Century is a 2017 book by the writer David Patrikarakos, in which the author draws from time embedded with forces in the Russian-Ukraine conflict as well as analysing the 2014 Hamas-Israel war, Operation Protective Edge and ISIS, to describe the increasing role played by social media in modern conflict.
The book has been optioned for development by triple-Oscar winner Angus Wall

Patrikarakos identifies "a new breed of ‘warriors’ in twenty-first-century conflict – the powerful, globally connected individuals" which he terms ‘homo digitalis'. They include the investigative journalist Eliot Higgins of Bellingcat, who is discussed in two chapters of the book.

Reviews
Patrikarakos' book was widely reviewed in the international press, including by Ben Judah in The Times, who wrote that "War in 140 Characters should be mandatory reading at Sandhurst." In the military sphere, War in 140 Characters was placed on the reading lists for the largest security conference in the world, the Munich Security Conference, and the UK's Royal Air Force Centre for Air Power Studies and singled out as essential reading by Admiral Foggo at an October 2018 meeting of the Atlantic Council. In January 2018, the incoming head of UK Chief of the Defence Staff, Nick Carter concluded his first major policy speech at Royal United Services Institute by calling on the 77 Brigade to observe the lessons of Patrikarakos' book.

References

External links 
 https://www.amazon.co.uk/War-140-Characters-Reshaping-Twenty-First/dp/046509614X

2017 non-fiction books
American non-fiction books
Books about war
Books about propaganda
English-language books
Social media
Basic Books books